The International Championship of Collegiate A Cappella (ICCA), originally the National Championship of Collegiate A Cappella ("NCCA", a play on NCAA), is an international competition that attracts hundreds of college a cappella groups each year.

History

Founded in 1996 by former Tufts University Beelzebubs music director Deke Sharon and former Brown University Derbies member Adam Farb, the ICCA tournament takes place from January through April in nine regions: Northwest, Southwest, Midwest, Great Lakes, Central, Mid-Atlantic, Northeast, South, and United Kingdom.

The ICCA has been presented by Varsity Vocals since 1999, when the competition was purchased by Don Gooding (Contemporary A Cappella Publishing).  The success of the ICCA produced two spin-off competitions: the International Championship of High School A Cappella (ICHSA), starting in 2005; and the International Championship of A Cappella Open (The Open), starting in 2017. Amanda Newman became owner of Varsity Vocals in 2008 and has since produced the events.

The 2006–2007 competition season was a focus of the book Pitch Perfect: The Quest for Collegiate A Cappella Glory, which followed three groups vying to win the Championship.  The book later became the basis for the Pitch Perfect film series, the first of which featured the protagonists competing in the ICCA.

The ICCA was also featured in the reality TV series Sing It On, which aired for two seasons (2015-2016) on POP TV. The series, which was executive produced by singer John Legend, premiered on May 13, 2015 and over the course of sixteen episodes followed groups such as the Nor'easters from Northeastern University, All-Night Yahtzee from Florida State University, Faux Paz from the University of Maryland, and S#arp Attitude from the University of Massachusetts as they advanced through the competition.

Abnormalities

1999 
The 1999 National Championship of Collegiate A Cappella tournament was never held due to financial difficulties. It was resumed in 2000 and renamed the International Championship of Collegiate A Cappella after its purchase by Don Gooding.

2020 
The 2020 ICCA tournament was cut short in March due to the COVID-19 pandemic. One quarterfinal, seven semifinals, the wild card round, and the 2020 ICCA Finals were cancelled.

2021 
The 2021 ICCA tournament was held entirely virtually to compensate for COVID-19 safety guidelines. It was the first time the entire tournament was free to watch.

Guidelines

There are five or six quarterfinal events held in each of the eight American regions (Central, Great Lakes, Mid-Atlantic, Midwest, Northeast, South, Southwest, West), while the United Kingdom region holds four. Generally, the top two college groups at each quarterfinal advance to the semifinals in their respective regions. The winner of each semifinal is invited to participate in finals, currently held at The Town Hall Theatre (the event has also been held in Lincoln Center for the Performing Arts, Carnegie Hall, PlayStation Theatre, and the Beacon Theatre), where they compete for coveted title of International Champion.

Each group prepares a short 12 minute performance (usually three songs) that best show the group's strengths. Primary focus is on a group's musical performance, but presentation is important so it's not unusual to see choreography involved as well. Groups generally range in size from 8-20. A panel of three to five trained judges evaluates the group's performance.

Vocal performance

According to official Varsity Vocals documents, the aspects of vocal performance that are integral to a high-scoring ICCA performance include balance and blend, quality and inventiveness of arrangement, rhythmic accuracy, interpretation of song, intonation, solo interpretation, tone quality, dynamic precision, and diction. The first six of these concepts are graded on a 1-10 scale, while the last three are graded on a 1-5 scale. These numbers are added up, then added to the number for the next section, Visual Performance. The total possible score for this section is 75.

Visual performance

Visual performance is, while not as highly weighted as vocal performance, still an integral aspect of any ICCA performance. The various aspects of visual performance include visual cohesiveness, effectiveness of presentation, energy/stage presence, appropriateness of movement, creativity of movement, transitioning/blocking, and professionalism. The first three categories are graded on a 1-10 scale, while the last four are graded on a 1-5 scale. The purpose of visual presentation is to present, not unlike a show choir, the emotiveness of a performance through body movement. While oftentimes a group may value Vocal Performance over Visual Performance, high marks and Semifinal award-winning performances have relied equally on the strength of their movement with that of their sound.

Subjective ranking
Finally, another crucial aspect of the performance grade comes in the form of a ranking box. If a judge decides that your group merits 1st, 2nd, or 3rd place in the overall competition, they circle one of these choices, which comes to correspond with an additive point value. So, if a judge decides you are the 1st place group, another 30 points are added to that individual judge's overall score. If they decide you are 2nd, you receive an additional 20 points, and if they decide you are 3rd, you receive an additional 10 points. These go towards the eventual rankings at the end of the night's performance, when the judges announce the first-place winner, the runner up, and the second runner up.

Occasionally the event has caught the attention of national media. The greatest television exposure was three successive performances on The Today Show in 2001, culminating with a Monday morning performance by the champions, the University of Michigan Compulsive Lyres.  The following year, competitors the Skidmore Dynamics were the subject of a New York Times article a few days before they took the stage at Lincoln Center.

Following their first ICCA win, and appearance on The Today Show in 2008, the SoCal VoCals were featured in an article in Newsweek Magazine.

In fiction 
Various ensembles compete for the ICCA national title in the comedy Pitch Perfect, while a fictionalized World Championship competition is portrayed in the 2015 sequel. Pitch Perfect 3 was released on December 22, 2017.

Previous Champions 

 (WC) - The 2012 and 2021 champions, The SoCal VoCals and Faux Paz, respectively, qualified for finals through the wild card round after placing 2nd at regional semifinals

Notes

12. Payson-Lewis, Dan. "My Real Hollywood Ending." Newsweek. 9 Aug. 2008: 32.

External links

Singing competitions
A cappella